Saux (pronounced "Sox"; Languedocien: Sauç) is a former commune in the Lot department in south-western France. On 1 January 2019, it was merged into the new commune of Porte-du-Quercy.

History 
The army of Simon de Montfort ravaged the village and demolished two castles there.

Administration 
Before 1789, there were two parishes in that village, the one at Saux known by the name of St. Andrew, the other at Tourniac by the name of St. Hilaire.  Curiously, both were a detached possession of the castellany of Lauzerte, despite being part of the Diocese of Cahors.

At that time, the village was known as Saux-de-Tourniac.

Tourniac 
Tourniac is a hamlet to the west of the village Saux. It was mentioned on the 18th century Cassini map as Tronhac. Formerly an independent commune, it was merged into Saux between 1795 and 1800.

See also
Communes of the Lot department

References 

Former communes of Lot (department)